Agalatovo (Russian: Агала́тово; Finnish: Ohalatva) is a rural locality (a selo) in Vsevolozhsk District of Leningrad Oblast, Russia. It is the garrison of the 6th Combined Arms Army.

Demographics

Population

As of 2014, the population of Agalatovo was 5155.

Ethnicity

According to the 2002 census, the ethnic composition of Agalatovo was:
Russian - 4034 (79.8%);
Ukrainian - 403 (8.0%);
Belorussians - 141 (2.8%);
Tatar - 68 (1.4%);
Other - 407 (8.1%).

References 

Rural localities in Leningrad Oblast